Marco Tilio (born 23 August 2001) is an Australian professional soccer player who plays as a forward for A-League club Melbourne City and the  Australia national team.

Club career

Sydney FC
At age 17, Tilio made his professional debut in the 2019 AFC Champions League in a group stage match against Kawasaki Frontale, replacing Anthony Caceres in the 74th minute as they went on to lose 4–0, being eliminated from the competition.

He was promoted to the first-team squad on 4 September 2019 at age 18 for the 2019–20 A-League season.

Tilio was part of the 2019–20 Y-League championship winning Sydney FC Youth team. He played 85 minutes and scored a brace as the Sky Blues beat Melbourne Victory Youth 5–1 in the 2020 Y-League Grand Final on 31 January 2020. He finished as the league's Golden Boot winner with 11 goals from nine games.

Tilio made his first A-League appearance as an 88th-minute substitute in a Round 20 clash against Central Coast Mariners on 23 February 2020, scoring Sydney's second goal in the 89th minute before assisting Harry Van Der Saag's 91st-minute strike as they ran out 3–0 winners.

Tilio left Sydney at the end of the 2019–20 A-League in September 2020, after rejecting a contract extension.

Melbourne City
On 21 September 2020, Melbourne City announced that Tilio had signed a three-year contract with the club. He made his Melbourne City debut in a starting appearance on 3 January 2021 against Adelaide United. On 5 April 2021, Tilio scored his first goal for Melbourne City in his eighth appearance for the club in a 3–2 away win over Wellington Phoenix in the A-League.

International

2019–present: Youth level and hat-trick
Tilio began his international career with the Young Socceroos in 2019, where he was called up to the Australia squad for the 2019 AFF U-18 Youth Championship. At age 17, Tilio played his first international game against the Vietnam U-20s in the 2019 AFF U-18 Youth Championship group stage where he scored a hat trick in the 1st, 34th and 90th minute.

On 22 July 2021, Tilio scored his first goal for the Olyroos in a 2–0 win against Argentina with his second touch after coming on as a substitute in the 80th minute.

On 20 November 2022, Tilio was named in Australia's squad for the 2022 FIFA World Cup after Martin Boyle was ruled out of the tournament due to injury.

Career statistics

Club

Honours
Melbourne City
 A-League Premiership: 2020-21
 A-League Championship: 2020-21

Sydney FC
 A-League Premiership: 2019–20
 Y-League: 2019–20

Australia U20
AFF U-19 Youth Championship: 2019

Individual
A-Leagues All Star: 2022

References

External links

2001 births
Living people
Australian people of Italian descent
Australian soccer players
Association football forwards
Sydney FC players
Melbourne City FC players
National Premier Leagues players
Footballers at the 2020 Summer Olympics
2022 FIFA World Cup players
Olympic soccer players of Australia